The Mesoregion of São José do Rio Preto is one of the 15 mesoregions of the São Paulo state, Brazil. It is located at the north/northwest portion of the state, and has an area of 29,394.7 km².

The mesoregion has a population of 1,569,220 inhabitants (IBGE/2010), spread over 109 municipalities.

Municipalities
All data from IBGE/2010

Microregion of Auriflama

Population: 46,367
Area (km²): 2,312.2
Population density (km²): 20.05

Auriflama, Floreal, Gastão Vidigal, General Salgado, Guzolândia, Magda, Nova Castilho, Nova Luzitânia, São João de Iracema

Microregion of Catanduva

Population: 221,465
Area (km²): 2,283.6
Population density (km²): 96.98

Ariranha, Cajobi, Catanduva, Catiguá, Elisiário, Embaúba, Novais, Palmares Paulista, Paraíso, Pindorama, Santa Adélia, Severínia, Tabapuã

Microregion of Fernandópolis

Population: 104,623
Area (km²): 2,811.7
Population density (km²): 37.21

Estrela d'Oeste, Fernandópolis, Guarani d'Oeste, Indiaporã, Macedônia, Meridiano, Mira Estrela, Ouroeste, Pedranópolis, São João das Duas Pontes, Turmalina

Microregion of Jales

Population: 149,197
Area (km²): 3,928.9
Population density (km²): 37.97

Aparecida d'Oeste, Aspásia, Dirce Reis, Dolcinópolis, Jales, Marinópolis, Mesópolis, Nova Canaã Paulista, Palmeira d'Oeste, Paranapuã, Pontalinda, Populina, Rubinéia, Santa Albertina, Santa Clara d'Oeste, Santa Fé do Sul, Santa Rita d'Oeste, Santa Salete, Santana da Ponte Pensa, São Francisco, Três Fronteiras, Urânia, Vitória Brasil

Microregion of Nhandeara

Population: 65,337
Area (km²): 2,016.7
Population density (km²): 32.40

Macaubal, Monções, Monte Aprazível, Neves Paulista, Nhandeara, Nipoã, Poloni, Sebastianópolis do Sul, União Paulista

Microregion of Novo Horizonte

Population: 79,222
Area (km²): 2,435.1
Population density (km²): 32.53

Irapuã, Itajobi, Marapoama, Novo Horizonte, Sales, Urupês

Microregion of São José do Rio Preto

Population: 763,534
Area (km²): 10,397.8
Population density (km²): 73.43

Adolfo, Altair, Bady Bassitt, Bálsamo, Cedral, Guapiaçu, Guaraci, Ibirá, Icém, Ipiguá, Jaci, José Bonifácio, Mendonça, Mirassol, Mirassolândia, Nova Aliança, Nova Granada, Olímpia, Onda Verde, Orindiúva, Palestina, Paulo de Faria, Planalto, Potirendaba, São José do Rio Preto, Tanabi, Ubarana, Uchoa, Zacarias

Microregion of Votuporanga

Population: 139,475
Area (km²): 3,208.7
Population density (km²): 43.47

Álvares Florence, Américo de Campos, Cardoso, Cosmorama, Parisi, Pontes Gestal, Riolândia, Valentim Gentil, Votuporanga

References

Sao